Scott Andrew Brister (born January 8, 1955) is a former justice of the Supreme Court of Texas, who served from November 2003 until September 2009.  He was appointed by Governor Rick Perry to serve the remainder of the term of Justice Craig T. Enoch. He was then elected to a regular six-year term in November 2004. Brister resigned from the court effective September 7, 2009, before the scheduled end of his term on December 31, 2010. He was succeeded on the court by Eva Guzman, the first female Hispanic to serve on the body. He is now employed as a Partner in the Austin office of the law firm Hunton Andrews Kurth.

Background
Brister is a native of Waco, Texas.  He is a 1977 summa cum laude graduate of Duke University in Durham, North Carolina, and the 1980 cum laude graduate of Harvard Law School in Cambridge, Massachusetts. In 1989, he  was appointed judge of the 234th District Court in Harris County, Texas by Governor Bill Clements and presided over that court until the end of 2000.  He was also local administrative judge for the Harris County civil district courts in 1998–1999.

He was elected to the First Court of Appeals of Texas, in 2000. He served on the First Court for less than two years before Perry appointed him chief justice of the Fourteenth Court of Appeals of Texas in 2001. He was elected to that position in 2002 and served the first eleven months of that term before he was appointed to the Texas Supreme Court.

He has home schooled all four of his daughters with wife Julie Upton Brister. He has four siblings: Robin Brister, Susan Brister, Michal Adams, and Steven Brister. The Bristers live in Georgetown, Texas. Brister, a Republican, was appointed to chair the Texas Commission on Public School Finance by Governor Greg Abbott in 2017.

 Neely v. West Orange-Cove Consolidated Independent School District (dissenting from judgment holding Texas school financing plan unconstitutional)

References

1954 births
Justices of the Texas Supreme Court
Duke University alumni
Harvard Law School alumni
Living people
Texas Republicans
People from Waco, Texas
People from Austin, Texas
Texas lawyers
Texas state court judges
People from Georgetown, Texas